Kapu is a village in Järva Parish, Järva County in northern-central Estonia.

The tallest structure in Estonia, Koeru TV Mast, is located in Kapu village.

References

 

Villages in Järva County
Kreis Jerwen